Susan Scott "Scottie" Thompson (born November 9, 1981) is an American film, television, and stage actress. She is best known as Jeanne Benoit in NCIS.

Early life
Thompson grew up in Richmond, Virginia, where she attended Collegiate School. From an early age, she began to learn ballet, jazz, and modern dance. She danced with the Richmond Ballet for many years, took a year off after graduating to dance with the company, and then went on to study for a degree in performance studies and literature at Harvard University. Thompson started dancing with the Harvard Ballet Company and acted in many theater productions. She was the publicity manager for the Hasty Pudding Theatricals in 2003, worked for Let's Go Travel Guides, and was credited as associate editor for the travel book Let's Go: Vietnam. Thompson graduated in 2005 with a bachelor's degree in performance studies and literature, focusing on French and postcolonial works.

Career

After graduating, Thompson landed her first role in the television show Brotherhood (2006) opposite Jason Isaacs. She then guest-starred in several television shows before landing a recurring role on the CBS show NCIS (2006–2007) as Dr. Jeanne Benoit, the girlfriend of Tony DiNozzo (played by Michael Weatherly) and the daughter of Rene Benoit (played by Armand Assante). She appeared regularly throughout season four and left the show in early season five (she reappeared later that season in the episode "Internal Affairs"). She then filmed the independent movie Pornstar (2008), co-starring Matthew Gray Gubler of Criminal Minds, and made guest appearances on Shark (2007), CSI: NY (2007), and Eli Stone (2008).

In 2008, Thompson appeared in the video for Counting Crows' single "You Can't Count on Me". She also had a small part in J. J. Abrams Star Trek. In February 2010, Thompson was cast in the Brothers Strause alien-apocalypse film Skyline, which was released in November of that year. She also appears in the Bon Jovi music video "What Do You Got?".

In 2013, she was cast as Lauren Kincade in the USA Network TV series Graceland. In 2015, she returned to NCIS as Dr. Jeanne Benoit.

Filmography

Film

Television

References

External links
 
 Scottie Thompson at the Harvard Theater Database

1981 births
Living people
21st-century American actresses
American film actresses
American stage actresses
American television actresses
Actresses from Richmond, Virginia
Hasty Pudding alumni